The Kosovo national men's handball team is the national handball team of Kosovo, representing the country in international competition. The team is governed by Handball Federation of Kosovo. The national handball team started competing in international competitions in 2014, following Kosovo's full status recognition from the International Handball Federation (IHF).

History
Handball first arrived in Kosovo in the late 1940s, and by 1948 there were several registered clubs starting to compete in informal domestic competitions. By 1951, indoor handball was introduced. Two years later, in 1953, Handball Federation of Kosovo was founded, under the auspices of the Yugoslav Handball Federation.

In 1979, whilst part of the former Yugoslavia, Kosovo hosted the 1979 Women's Junior World Handball Championship.

Following the breakdown of Yugoslavia and subsequent independence of Kosovo as a nation, Handball Federation of Kosovo began operating independently.

In 2014, six years after Kosovo declared independence, the European Handball Federation (EHF) recognised Kosovo as a full member state and immediately the Kosovo national handball team started competing in international competition.

After a difficult start, Kosovo's national team has started to gain notoriety in international competition. After twice winning the bronze medal in the international IHF Trophy for emerging nations, in Kosovo 2015 on home soil and as well in Bulgaria 2017 the team is no longer considered an emerging nation. Kosovo after this tournament advanced to the 2nd phase of qualification for EURO 2020.

Following a lengthy campaign in the 2020 European Men's Handball Championship qualification where Kosovo defeated Israel and drew Poland, the team won a direct spot in the second phase of the upcoming 2022 qualification tournament.

Most recently, at the 2021 World Men's Handball Championship – European qualification tournament, Kosovo drew with Italy and defeated Georgia to take the second place, behind Romania, in the qualifying group.

IHF Emerging Nations Championship

Team

Current squad
The squad selected for the 2024 European Men's Handball Championship  qualification matches.
Updated: 22 December 2022
Head coach: Bujar Qerimi

Coaches

Captains
 Ylber Mjeku (2014–2016)
 Valon Dedaj (2016-)

Individual all-time records

Most matches played
Total number of matches played in official competitions only.

Most goals scored
Total number of goals scored in official competitions only.

Notes and references

Notes

References

External links
 
IHF profile

Men's national handball teams
National sports teams of Kosovo